Walter Iooss Jr. (born September 15, 1943) is an American photographer noted for his images of athletes, including Michael Jordan, Kelly Slater, Tiger Woods, Scottie Pippen, and Muhammad Ali. He has been called "the poet laureate of sports."

Iooss began his career shooting for Sports Illustrated and contributed to the magazine for more than 50 years. He also photographed for the magazine's Swimsuit Issue for 40 years. Bruce Silverstein Gallery exclusively represents Iooss' fine art photography.

Birth and early life

Born in Temple, Texas, Walter Iooss moved at the age of five from Temple to East Orange, New Jersey. In 1959, at the age of 16, he shot his first roll of film at a professional football game with a camera his father bought him. The following year he attended the German School of Photography in New York City during the summer. One year later, at the age of 17 years, Walter got his first assignment from Sports Illustrated—-the same year he graduated from East Orange High School. Two years later he shot his first cover for Sports Illustrated, but five more years would bring about a change of pace for Walter. Contrary to the sports images that he had been shooting, he then became an in-house photographer for Atlantic Records. In 2004 he was awarded with the LUCIE Lifetime Achievement Award for Sports Photography.

Career 1968–
From 1968 through 1972, Iooss was an in-house photographer for Atlantic Records in New York, where his subjects included performers like James Brown, Jimi Hendrix and Janis Joplin.

In 1982, Iooss was recruited by Fujifilm to work on an extended study of athletes who were working their way to the 1984 Summer Olympics in Los Angeles. The two-and-a-half-year project required him to leave his position on the staff of Sports Illustrated (though he continued to contribute) and resulted in the publication of the book Shooting for the Gold.

In the late 1980s, Iooss was commissioned to photograph advertising campaigns for Camel cigarettes.

In 1993, Iooss' work was featured on 27 baseball cards in an Upper Deck set dubbed "The Iooss Collection."

Though he has worked with athletes and models, Iooss has also photographed Cuban children playing ball in the street and captured the raw desire of Thai kickboxers. According to Iooss, "The real joy of photography is these moments. I'm always looking for freedom, the search for the one-on-one. That's when your instincts come out."

Exhibitions

Awards and nominations 
 2004: Lucie award for Lifetime Achievement in Sports Photography.

Personal 
Iooss is married to Eva Iooss, with whom he has two sons, Christian and Bjorn.

References

Bibliography
 Heaven, Sports Illustrated, 2010 
 Athlete, Sports Illustrated, 2008 
 Walter Iooss: A Lifetime Shooting Sports & Beauty, Watson-Guptill, 1999 
 Hoops: Four Decades of the Pro Game, Harry N. Abrams Inc., 2005 
 Rare Air: Michael on Michael, Collins, 1993 
 Drumm, Russell (1999). Still Magic. Walter Iooss: A Lifetime Shooting Sports & Beauty. Graphis Press. .

External links
 Walter Iooss background
 Walter Iooss' personal web site
 "Gallery: Walter Iooss' Sports Photos," TIME.com 
professional portfolio
Gallery representation website

1943 births
Living people
American photojournalists
Sports Illustrated photojournalists
People from Temple, Texas
People from East Orange, New Jersey
Journalists from Texas